"Drown" is a song by American alternative rock band The Smashing Pumpkins from the soundtrack to the 1992 Cameron Crowe film Singles.

Release
The song debuted during the Gish tour and was written not long after that record was released. 
The first take of the song was recorded at Waterfront Studios, which belongs to Lenny Kravitz, who was also signed to Virgin Records.
The song became a moderate radio hit in mid-1992 and gave the band significant exposure just before work commenced on Siamese Dream.

"Drown" was to be released as a commercial single, but, as Billy Corgan explained,

Nonetheless, the song was given a promotional single, and became their highest-charting single at the time, peaking at number 24 on the U.S. Alternative Songs chart.

The song has also been released publicly as an early demo through SPRC, which is 8:58 in length.

Greatest hits release
The song was also released on the band's official greatest hits compilation Rotten Apples in 2001, though the length of the song was reduced from 8:17 to 4:30, cutting off the extended feedback and E-Bow solo at the end. "Drown" was considered for Pisces Iscariot, but Corgan decided against it.

Gish (2011 reissue)
The complete version of "Drown" was included with an alternate guitar solo on the bonus CD in the 2011 Reissue of Gish.

Charts

References 

The Smashing Pumpkins songs
1992 singles
Songs written by Billy Corgan
Song recordings produced by Billy Corgan
1992 songs
Song recordings produced by Butch Vig
Epic Records singles